1862 may refer to

 The year 1862
 1862 (novel)
 Flight El Al Flight 1862